A list of all demos written and recorded by American heavy metal band Metallica.

Whiskey Audition Tape
These two cover songs were recorded in then-bassist Ron McGovney’s garage, during rehearsals that took place in March 1982. On the strength of this demo tape, Metallica were booked to open for NWOBHM band Saxon on March 27, 1982, at the Los Angeles club Whisky a Go Go.

Personnel
 James Hetfield – lead vocals
 Lars Ulrich – drums
 Dave Mustaine – guitar, backing vocals
 Ron McGovney – bass

Ron McGovney's '82 Garage demo
This demo tape was also recorded in McGovney's garage during March 1982. Although the demo has never been officially released, it has been in wide circulation in various bootleg versions. Apart from the songs listed below, two other tracks recorded during different sessions, consisting of songwriting ideas and various unreleased riffs, have also been widely bootlegged. One track consisting of riffs and ideas that would later go on to become both Metallica and Megadeth songs is commonly titled as "Jam", while the other track is a melodic piece played by Hetfield and McGovney, widely known on YouTube as "Unreleased Kill 'Em All song". The validity of these two tracks was confirmed by McGovney, during a 1996 interview with Shock Waves and also via the Metallicabb forum. No Remorse and Helpless have circulated on Youtube as the Whiskey demo, though this isn't true.

 James Hetfield – lead vocals, rhythm guitar
 Lars Ulrich – drums
 Dave Mustaine – lead guitar, backing vocals
 Ron McGovney – bass

Power Metal demo
Power Metal is the name given to a demo recorded sometime in April 1982. Although the demo has never been officially released, it was given the bootleg name "Power Metal" after the tagline McGovney had printed on Metallica's first business cards. The tape contained four original songs, including two new songs, "The Mechanix", written by Dave Mustaine, and "Motorbreath", written by James Hetfield. It was, like all previous demos, also recorded in McGovney's garage.

Personnel
 James Hetfield – lead vocals, rhythm guitar
 Lars Ulrich – drums
 Dave Mustaine – lead guitar, backing vocals
 Ron McGovney – bass 
 "The Mechanix" is the original version of "The Four Horsemen", which later appeared on Metallica's 1983 debut album Kill 'Em All. Mustaine also included a reworked version of the song, simply titled "Mechanix", on Megadeth's 1985 debut album, Killing Is My Business... and Business Is Good!.

No Life 'Til Leather
No Life 'Til Leather was recorded on July 6, 1982. It is Metallica's most widely circulated demo tape. All of the tracks are early recordings of songs that would later appear on the band's debut album Kill 'Em All. The only songs on Kill 'Em All that aren’t on the tape are Cliff Burton's bass solo "(Anesthesia) Pulling Teeth", "Whiplash", "No Remorse" and "The Four Horsemen" (See notes above). It is unknown why "No Remorse" didn’t appear, as it was on an earlier demo. The title of the demo comes from the first line of "Hit the Lights".

The demo has been re-released twice unofficially, first under the title of Metallica: Bay Area Thrashers, and was alleged to be a live bootleg recording of Metallica in the early days, however all "live" sounds had been added from various sources including the Metallica video Cliff 'Em All. This was soon discovered by Metallica and all copies were removed from stores. The demo was re-released a second time under the title Metallica: In the Beginning... Live, containing no apparent differences from Metallica: Bay Area Thrashers.

In March 2015, Metallica announced that they would be releasing No Life 'Til Leather on limited-edition cassette for Record Store Day.

As Lars Ulrich told Rolling Stone magazine: "It's time for us to put out some next-level reissues and do the song and dance of the catalog that everyone else has done; the U2s and the Led Zeppelins and the Oasises [...] Instead of starting with Kill 'Em All in 1983, we figured we'd go back another two years to when the band was formed in 1981."

Personnel
 James Hetfield – lead vocals, rhythm guitar
 Lars Ulrich – drums
 Dave Mustaine – lead guitar, backing vocals
 Ron McGovney – bass
 Cliff Burton is credited on the inside sleeve of the demo, but does not perform.

Live Metal Up Your Ass
Metal Up Your Ass was recorded on November 29, 1982, at the Old Waldorf in San Francisco. The supporting band was Exodus, featuring Metallica's future lead guitarist Kirk Hammett. The band played all of its original material (nine songs) that the group had written up to that point, which included all of the songs from its previous demo No Life 'Til Leather and two new songs (which were later released on the Megaforce demo), all nine of which would essentially be the entirety of their debut album minus Cliff's bass solo "(Anesthesia)-Pulling Teeth". Two covers of Diamond Head songs were played, "Am I Evil?" and "The Prince", however "The Prince" was not recorded as the tape ran out before the full duration of the band's set.

Both the name and album cover of the demo were to be reused for the band's debut studio album, now called Kill 'Em All. However, Metallica's record company would not allow it. In 1997, melodic punk band 88 Fingers Louie parodied both the title and cover art with their EP titled 88 Fingers Up Your Ass.

Personnel
 James Hetfield – lead vocals, rhythm guitar
 Lars Ulrich – drums
 Dave Mustaine – lead guitar, backing vocals
 Ron McGovney – bass 
 Cliff Burton is credited on the inside sleeve of the demo, but does not perform.

Megaforce demo
The Megaforce demo was recorded on March 16, 1983, and was the band's last demo release recorded with Dave Mustaine. The tape was recorded with the intention of introducing Burton to potential record labels and earned the band a contract with Megaforce Records. It was also played live on KUSF FM in San Francisco. The demo contained one new song, "Whiplash", and “No Remorse”. It has received a number of names including the Megaforce demo (due to it earning a contract with Megaforce), The KUSF Demo (due to it being played on KUSF FM) and Whiplash/No Remorse Demo.

Personnel
 James Hetfield – lead vocals, rhythm guitar
 Lars Ulrich – drums
 Dave Mustaine – lead guitar, backing vocals
 Cliff Burton – bass, backing vocals

Ride the Lightning demo
The Ride the Lightning demo was recorded on October 29, 1983. It was the group's first demo recording to feature lead guitarist Kirk Hammett. The demo contained the original material Metallica had written that was not released on Kill 'Em All. Both "Ride the Lightning" and "When Hell Freezes Over" (later renamed "The Call of Ktulu") were co-written by Dave Mustaine. "Fight Fire with Fire" and "Ride the Lightning" had been changed from their original versions due to input from Cliff Burton. All four songs appeared on the band's second studio album Ride the Lightning. The four demos for Ride the Lightning were recorded at the expense of Metallica's European record label, Music for Nations, at the same time the band recorded versions of "Seek & Destroy" and "Phantom Lord" to be used as fake "live" B-sides for the "Whiplash" and "Jump in the Fire" singles. In 2005, seven other re-recorded demos surfaced on bootlegs. Out of the seven demos that surfaced, only "Trapped Under Ice" was confirmed as an official demo.

Personnel
 James Hetfield – lead vocals, rhythm guitar
 Lars Ulrich – drums
 Cliff Burton – bass, backing vocals
 Kirk Hammett – lead guitar

Master of Puppets demos
The Master of Puppets demos were recorded on July 14, 1985, and is essentially a rehearsal more than a demo. The demo includes five songs that were included on its third studio album, Master of Puppets (1986).

Personnel
 James Hetfield – lead vocals, rhythm guitar; guitar solo on "Master of Puppets" and "Welcome Home (Sanitarium)"
 Lars Ulrich – drums
 Cliff Burton – bass, backing vocals
 Kirk Hammett – lead guitar

…And Justice for All demos
The …And Justice for All demos were recorded in 1987 and include early, shorter versions of songs which later appeared on the band's fourth studio album, …And Justice for All (1988). It was the group's first demo album to feature Jason Newsted on bass. The intro to "Blackened" on the demo is an unreversed version, unlike the reversed version that appeared on …And Justice for All. "The Frayed Ends of Sanity" was recorded with gibberish sung in place of most lyrics (with the exception of the chorus' "Frayed ends of sanity/Hear them calling me"), although the final version of the song contains lyrics. "Eye of the Beholder" has two different demo versions, however there are few differences between the two besides running time and some lyrical differences, one of which includes an improvised lyric about James needing to write lyrics for the song. Most demo versions of the album do not include both takes of the song.

Personnel
 James Hetfield – lead vocals, rhythm guitar; guitar solo on "To Live Is to Die"
 Lars Ulrich – drums
 Kirk Hammett – lead guitar
 Jason Newsted – bass, backing vocals

Metallica demos
The demos recorded for Metallica's self-titled fifth album were recorded by James and Lars on August 13, 1990 in Lars’ home studio, "The Dungeon". Four of the songs from this particular session were later released as B-sides on various album singles. Contrary to popular belief, the demo for The Unforgiven was not from this session, as the song hadn’t been finished yet. The version of Holier Than Thou that appeared on the Enter Sandman single was not recorded at this session either.

Personnel
 James Hetfield – lead vocals, rhythm guitar, lead guitar, bass guitar
 Lars Ulrich – drums

Load and Reload demos
Many of the songs that would later appear on both the Load and Reload albums were recorded as demos by Hetfield and Ulrich between winter 1994 and spring 1995 in Ulrich's home studio, "The Dungeon". A large portion of the recorded tracks were released on the MetClub only release Fan Can III, while other songs were released throughout various singles from both albums. Most songs were released under working titles, as opposed to their final titles as appear on each album.

Fan Can III

Single releases

Personnel
 James Hetfield – lead vocals, rhythm guitar, lead guitar, bass 
 Lars Ulrich – drums, percussion

Demo Magnetic
Metallica's ninth studio album, Death Magnetic, had all its songs released as demos, recorded between November 2005 and January 2007. The demos were included on a bonus disc titled Demo Magnetic, released with a different "experience" version of Death Magnetic. The track listing order remained the same, however the track list uses the working titles instead of the final titles. All music was written by Metallica, while all lyrics were written by James Hetfield. It is the group's first demo album to feature Robert Trujillo on bass.

Personnel
 James Hetfield – lead vocals, rhythm guitar; guitar solos on "K2LU"; keyboards on "UN3"
 Lars Ulrich – drums; backing vocals on "Ten"
 Kirk Hammett – lead guitar, backing vocals
 Robert Trujillo – bass, backing vocals

References

Demos
Demo albums
Lists of albums by artist